Roger Cooreman (born 25 June 1941) is a Belgian racing cyclist. He rode in the 1969 Tour de France.

References

1941 births
Living people
Belgian male cyclists
Place of birth missing (living people)